The desegregation of Boston public schools (1974–1988) was a period in which the Boston Public Schools were under court control to desegregate through a system of busing students. The call for desegregation and the first years of its implementation led to a series of racial protests and riots that brought national attention, particularly from 1974 to 1976. In response to the Massachusetts legislature's enactment of the 1965 Racial Imbalance Act, which ordered the state's public schools to desegregate, W. Arthur Garrity Jr. of the United States District Court for the District of Massachusetts laid out a plan for compulsory busing of students between predominantly white and black areas of the city. The hard control of the desegregation plan lasted for over a decade. It influenced Boston politics and contributed to demographic shifts of Boston's school-age population, leading to a decline of public-school enrollment and white flight to the suburbs. Full control of the desegregation plan was transferred to the Boston School Committee in 1988; in 2013 the busing system was replaced by one with dramatically reduced busing.

History

Racial Imbalance Act 

On April 1, 1965, a special committee appointed by Massachusetts Education Commissioner Owen Kiernan released its final report finding that more than half of black students enrolled in Boston Public Schools (BPS) attended institutions with enrollments that were at least 80 percent black and that housing segregation in the city had caused the racial imbalance. From its creation under the National Housing Act of 1934 signed into law by President Franklin D. Roosevelt, the Federal Housing Administration used its official mortgage insurance underwriting policy explicitly to prevent school integration. The Boston Housing Authority actively segregated the city's public housing developments since at least 1941 and continued to do so despite the passage of legislation by the 156th Massachusetts General Court prohibiting racial discrimination or segregation in housing in 1950 and the issuance of Executive Order 11063 by President John F. Kennedy in 1962 that required all federal agencies to prevent racial discrimination in federally-funded subsidized housing in the United States.

In response to the report, on April 20, 1965, the Boston NAACP filed a lawsuit in federal district court against the city seeking the desegregation of the city's public schools. Massachusetts Governor John Volpe (1961–1963 & 1965–1969) filed a request for legislation from the state legislature that defined schools with nonwhite enrollments greater than 50 percent to be imbalanced and granted the State Board of Education the power to withhold state funds from any school district in the state that was found to have racial imbalance, which Volpe would sign into law the following August. Also in August 1965, Governor Volpe, Boston Mayor John F. Collins (1960–1968), and BPS Superintendent William H. Ohrenberger warned the Boston School Committee that a vote that they held that month to abandon a proposal to bus several hundred blacks students from Roxbury and North Dorchester from three overcrowded schools to nearby schools in Dorchester and Brighton, and purchase an abandoned Hebrew school in Dorchester to relieve the overcrowding instead, could now be held by a court to be deliberate acts of segregation. Pursuant to the Racial Imbalance Act, the state conducted a racial census and found 55 imbalanced schools in the state with 46 in Boston, and in October 1965, the State Board required the School Committee to submit a desegregation plan, which the School Committee did the following December.

The Racial Imbalance Act of 1965 is the legislation passed by the Massachusetts General Court which made the segregation of public schools illegal in Massachusetts. The law, the first of its kind in the United States, stated that "racial imbalance shall be deemed to exist when the percent of nonwhite students in any public school is in excess of fifty per cent of the total number of students in such school." These racially imbalanced schools were required to desegregate according to the law or risk losing their state educational funding. An initial report released in March 1965, "Because it is Right-Educationally," revealed that 55 schools in Massachusetts were racially imbalanced, 44 of which were in the City of Boston. The Boston School Committee was told that the complete integration of the Boston Public Schools needed to occur before September 1966 without the assurance of either significant financial aid or suburban cooperation in accepting African American students from Boston or the schools would lose funding.

Boston School Committee opposition to the Racial Imbalance Act 
After the passage of the Racial Imbalance Act, the Boston School Committee, under the leadership of Louise Day Hicks, consistently disobeyed orders from the state Board of Education, first to develop a busing plan, and then to support its implementation. Hicks was adamant about her belief that this busing was not what communities and families wanted.

In April 1966, the State Board found the School Committee's plan to desegregate the Boston Public Schools in accordance with the Racial Imbalance Act of 1965 inadequate and voted to rescind state aid to the district, and in response, the School Committee filed a lawsuit against the State Board challenging both the decision and the constitutionality of the Racial Imbalance Act the following August. In January 1967, the Massachusetts Superior Court overturned a Suffolk Superior Court ruling that the State Board had improperly withdrawn the funds and ordered the School Committee to submit an acceptable plan to the State Board within 90 days or else permanently lose funding, which the School Committee did shortly thereafter and the State Board accepted. In June 1967, the Massachusetts Supreme Judicial Court upheld the constitutionality of the Racial Imbalance Act and the U.S. Supreme Court under Chief Justice Earl Warren (1953–1969) declined to hear the School Committee's appeal in January 1968. On May 25, 1971, the Massachusetts State Board of Education voted unanimously to withhold state aid from the Boston Public Schools due to the School Committee's refusal to use the district's open enrollment policy to relieve the city's racial imbalance in enrollments, instead routinely granting white students transfers while doing nothing to assist black students attempting to transfer.

On March 15, 1972, the Boston NAACP filed a lawsuit, later named Morgan v. Hennigan, against the Boston School Committee in federal district court. After being randomly assigned to the case, on June 21, 1974, Judge W. Arthur Garrity Jr. ruled that the open enrollment and controlled transfer policies that the School Committee created in 1961 and 1971 respectively were being used to effectively discriminate on the basis of race, and that the School Committee had maintained segregation in the Boston Public Schools by adding portable classrooms to overcrowded white schools instead of assigning white students to nearby underutilized black schools, while simultaneously purchasing closed white schools and busing black students past open white schools with vacant seats. In accordance with the Racial Imbalance Act, the School Committee would be required to bus 17,000 to 18,000 students the following September (Phase I) and to formulate a desegregation plan for the 1975–1976 school year by December 16 (Phase II). Twenty minutes after Judge Garrity's deadline for submitting the Phase II plan expired on December 16, 1974, the School Committee voted to reject the desegregation plan proposed by the department's Educational Planning Center. On December 18, Garrity summoned all five Boston School Committee members to court, held three of the members to be in contempt of court on December 27, and told the members on December 30 that he would purge their contempt holdings if they voted to authorize submission of a Phase II plan by January 7.

On January 7, 1975, the School Committee directed school department planners to file a voluntary-only busing proposal with the court. On May 10, the Massachusetts U.S. District Court announced a Phase II plan requiring 24,000 students to be bused that was formulated by a four-member committee consisting of former Massachusetts Supreme Judicial Court Justice Jacob Spiegel, former U.S. Education Commissioner Francis Keppel, Harvard Graduate School of Education professor Charles V. Willie, and former Massachusetts Attorney General Edward J. McCormack that was formed by Judge Garrity the previous February. On June 14, the U.S. Supreme Court under Chief Justice Warren E. Burger (1969–1986) unanimously declined to review the School Committee's appeal of the Phase II plan. In December 1975, Judge Garrity ordered South Boston High School put under federal receivership. In December 1982, Judge Garrity transferred responsibility for monitoring of compliance to the State Board for the subsequent two years, and in September 1985, Judge Garrity issued his final orders returning jurisdiction of the schools to the School Committee. In May 1990, Judge Garrity delivered his final judgment in Morgan v. Hennigan, formally closing the original case.

Development and implementation of busing 
In 1972, the NAACP filed a class-action lawsuit (Morgan v. Hennigan with Tallulah Morgan as the main plaintiff) against the Boston School Committee on behalf of 14 parents and 44 children alleging segregation in the Boston public schools. Two years later, Judge W. Arthur Garrity Jr. of the United States District Court for the District of Massachusetts found a recurring pattern of racial discrimination in the operation of the Boston public schools in a 1974 ruling. His ruling found the schools were unconstitutionally segregated, and required the implementation the state's Racial Imbalance Act, requiring any Boston school with a student enrollment that was more than 50% nonwhite to be balanced according to race.

As a remedy, Garrity used a busing plan developed by the Massachusetts State Board of Education, then oversaw its implementation for the next 13 years. Judge Garrity's ruling, upheld on appeal by the United States Court of Appeals for the First Circuit and by the Supreme Court led by Warren Burger, required school children to be brought to different schools to end segregation.

The busing plan affected the entire city, though the working-class neighborhoods of the racially divided city—whose children went predominantly to public schools—were most affected: the predominantly Irish-American neighborhoods of West Roxbury, Roslindale, Hyde Park, Charlestown, and South Boston and; the predominantly Italian-American North End neighborhood; the predominantly black neighborhoods of Roxbury, Mattapan, and the South End; and the mixed but segregated neighborhood of Dorchester.

In one part of the plan, Judge Garrity decided that the entire junior class from the mostly poor white South Boston High School would be bused to Roxbury High School, a black high school. Half the sophomores from each school would attend the other, and seniors could decide what school to attend. David Frum asserts that South Boston and Roxbury were "generally regarded as the two worst schools in Boston, and it was never clear what educational purpose was to be served by jumbling them." For three years after the plan commenced, Massachusetts state troopers were stationed at South Boston High. The first day of the plan, only 100 of 1,300 students came to school at South Boston. Only 13 of the 550 South Boston juniors ordered to attend Roxbury showed up. Parents showed up every day to protest, and football season was cancelled. Whites and blacks began entering through different doors.  An anti-busing mass movement developed, called Restore Our Alienated Rights.

The final Judge Garrity-issued decision in Morgan v. Hennigan came in 1985, after which control of the desegregation plan was given to the School Committee in 1988.

Impact 
The integration plan aroused fierce criticism among some Boston residents.  Of the 100,000 enrolled in Boston school districts, attendance fell from 60,000 to 40,000 during these years. Opponents personally attacked Judge Garrity, claiming that because he lived in a white suburb, his own children were not affected by his ruling. The co-author of the busing plan, Robert Dentler, lived in the suburb of Lexington, which was unaffected by the ruling. Judge Garrity's hometown of Wellesley welcomed a small number of black students under the voluntary METCO program that sought to assist in desegregating the Boston schools by offering places in suburban school districts to black students, but students from Wellesley were not forced to attend school elsewhere. Senator Ted Kennedy was also criticized for supporting busing when he sent his own children to private schools.

Protests and violence

ROAR 

Restore Our Alienated Rights (ROAR) was an anti-desegregation busing organization formed in Boston, Massachusetts by Boston School Committee chairwoman Louise Day Hicks in 1974. Using tactics modeled on the civil rights movement, ROAR activists led marches in Charlestown and South Boston, public prayers, sit-ins of school buildings and government offices, protests at the homes of prominent Bostonians, mock funerals, and even a small march on Washington DC. By 1976, with the failure to block implementation of the busing plan, the organization declined.

Violence 
From September 1974 through the fall of 1976, at least 40 riots occurred in the city. On September 12, 1974, 79 of 80 schools were bused without incident (with South Boston High School being the lone exception), and through October 10, there were 149 arrests (40 percent occurring at South Boston High alone), 129 injuries, and $50,000 in property damage. On October 15, an interracial stabbing at Hyde Park High School led to a riot that injured 8, and at South Boston High on December 11, a non-fatal interracial stabbing led to a riotous crowd of 1,800 to 2,500 whites hurling projectiles at police while white students fled the facility and black students remained. State Senator William Bulger, State Representative Raymond Flynn, and Boston City Councilor Louise Day Hicks made their way to the school, and Hicks spoke through a bullhorn to the crowd and urged them to allow the black students still in South Boston High to leave in peace, which they did, while the police made only 3 arrests, the injured numbered 25 (including 14 police), and the rioters badly damaged 6 police vehicles.

On February 12, 1975, interracial fighting broke out at Hyde Park High that would last for three days with police making 14 arrests, while no major disturbances occurred in March or April. On May 3, the Progressive Labor Party (PLP) organized an anti-racism march in South Boston, where 250 PLP marchers attacked 20 to 30 South Boston youths and over 1,000 South Boston residents responded, with the police making 8 arrests (including 3 people from New York City) and the injured numbered 10. From June 10 through July 7, police made no arrests in more than a dozen of what they described as "racial incidents."

On July 27, 1975, a group of black bible salesmen from South Carolina went swimming on Carson Beach, and in response, hundreds of white male and female bathers gathered with pipes and sticks and chased the bible salesmen from the beach on foot with the mob destroying their car and the police making two arrests. The following Sunday, August 3, a taxicab with a black driver and three Hispanic passengers were subjected to projectiles from passerby as they drove past the beach. In response, on August 10, black community leaders organized a protest march and picnic at the beach where 800 police and a crowd of whites from South Boston were on hand. 2,000 blacks and 4,000 whites fought and lobbed projectiles at each other for over 2 hours until police closed the beach after 40 injuries and 10 arrests.

On September 8, 1975, the first day of school, while there was only one school bus stoning from Roxbury to South Boston, citywide attendance was only 58.6 percent, and in Charlestown (where only 314 of 883 students or 35.6 percent attended Charlestown High School) gangs of youths roamed the streets hurling projectiles at police, overturning cars, setting trash cans on fire, and stoning firemen. 75 youths stormed Bunker Hill Community College after classes ended and assaulted a black student in the lobby, while 300 youths marched up Breed's Hill, overturning and burning cars. On October 24, 15 students at South Boston High were arrested.

On January 21, 1976, 1,300 black and white students fought each other at Hyde Park High, and at South Boston High on February 15, anti-busing activists organized marches under a parade permit from the Andrew Square and Broadway MBTA Red Line stations which would meet and end at South Boston High. After confusion between the marchers and the police about the parade route led marchers to attempt to walk through a police line, the marchers began throwing projectiles at the police, the marchers regrouped, and migrated to South Boston High where approximately 1,000 demonstrators engaged with police in a full riot that required the police to employ tear gas. 80 police were injured and 13 rioters were arrested. On April 5, civil rights attorney Ted Landsmark was assaulted by a white teenager at City Hall Plaza with a flagpole bearing the American flag (famously depicted in a 1977 Pulitzer Prize-winning photograph, The Soiling of Old Glory published in the Boston Herald American by photojournalist Stanley Forman).

On April 19, 1976, black youths in Roxbury assaulted a white motorist and beat him comatose, while numerous car stonings occurred through April, and on April 28, a bomb threat at Hyde Park High emptied the building and resulted in a melee between black and white students that require police action to end. On the evening of September 7, the night before the first day of school, white youths in Charlestown threw projectiles at police and injured 2 U.S. Marshals, a crowd in South Boston stoned an MBTA bus with a black driver, and the next day, youths in Hyde Park, Roxbury, and Dorchester stoned buses transporting outside students in. Incidents of interracial violence in Boston would continue from November 1977 through at least 1993.

There were a number of protest incidents that turned severely violent, even resulting in deaths.  In one case, attorney Theodore Landsmark was attacked and bloodied by a group of white teenagers as he exited Boston City Hall.  One of the youths, Joseph Rakes, attacked Landsmark with an American flag.  A photograph of the attack, The Soiling of Old Glory, taken by Stanley Forman for the Boston Herald American, won the Pulitzer Prize for Spot News Photography in 1977. In a retaliatory incident about two weeks later, Black teenagers in Roxbury threw rocks at auto mechanic Richard Poleet's car and caused him to crash. The youths dragged him out and crushed his skull with nearby paving stones.  When police arrived, the man was surrounded by a crowd of 100 chanting "Let him die" while lying in a coma from which he never recovered.

In another instance, a white teenager was stabbed nearly to death by a Black teenager at South Boston High School. The community's white residents mobbed the school, trapping the Black students inside. There were dozens of other racial incidents at South Boston High that year, predominantly of racial taunting of the Black students. The school closed for a month after the stabbing. When it opened again, it was one of the first high schools to install metal detectors; with 400 students attending, it was guarded by 500 police officers every day. In December 1975, Judge Garrity turned out the principal of South Boston High and took control himself.

Judge Garrity increased the plan down to first grade for the following school year. In October 1975, 6,000 marched against the busing in South Boston.

Impact on Boston Public Schools 
In 1987, a federal appeals court ruled that Boston had successfully implemented its desegregation plan and was in compliance with civil rights law. Although 13 public schools were defined as "racially identifiable," with over 80 percent of the student population either White or Black, the court ruled "all these schools are in compliance with the district court's desegregation orders" because their make-up "is rooted not in discrimination but in more intractable demographic obstacles."

Before the desegregation plan went into effect, overall enrollment and white enrollment in Boston Public Schools was in decline as the Baby Boom ended, gentrification altered the economic makeup of the city, and Jewish, Irish and Italian immigrant populations moved to the suburbs while black, Hispanic, and Asian populations moved to the city. Although the busing plan, by its very nature, shaped the enrollment at specific schools, it is unclear what effect it had on underlying demographic trends. By the time the court-controlled busing system ended in 1988, the Boston school district had shrunk from 100,000 students to 57,000, only 15% of whom were white.

End of racial desegregation policy 
In 1983, oversight of the desegregation system was shifted from Garrity to the Massachusetts Board of Education. With his final ruling in 1985, Garrity began transfer of control of the desegregation system to the Boston School Committee. After a federal appeals court ruled in September 1987 that Boston's desegregation plan was successful, the Boston School Committee took full control of the plan in 1988. In November 1998, a federal appeals court struck down racial preference guidelines for assignment at Boston Latin School, the most prestigious school in the system, the result of a lawsuit filed in 1995 by a white parent whose daughter was denied admission. On July 15, 1999, the Boston School Committee voted to drop racial make-up guidelines from its assignment plan for the entire system, but the busing system continued.

In 2013, the busing system was replaced by one which dramatically reduced busing. Beginning with school year 2014, they switched to a new policy that gives each family preference for schools near their home, while still ensuring that all students have access to quality high schools.

The voluntary METCO program, which was established in 1966, remains in operation, as do other inter-district school choice programs.

Boston's current school demographics 
In 2014, Boston public schools were 40% Hispanic, 35% Black, 13% White, 9% Asian-American and 2% from other races. In that same year, the school-age population of Boston was 38% black, 34% Hispanic, 19% white, and 7% Asian. The vast majority of white public school enrollment is in surrounding suburbs. In metropolitan Boston, public school enrollment in 2014-2015 was 64% White, 17% Hispanic, 9% black, and 7% Asian.

In the 2019-2020 school year, Boston Public Schools were 42.5% hispanic, 33% black, 14% white, 9% asian, and 1.5% other or multiracial. The demographics of teachers and guidance counselors at Boston Public Schools are as follows: 59.7% white, 21.5% black, 10.7% hispanic, 6.2% asian, and 2% other. The 23,094 school-age children living in Boston that do not attend Boston Public Schools have the following demographics: 46% black, 23% white, 19% hispanic, 3% asian, and 8% other.

See also
 Wendell Arthur Garrity Jr., judge who ordered desegregation
 Kathleen Sullivan Alioto, School committee Chair and member
 John J. Kerrigan, School Committee Chair and member
 Ruth Batson, in her work with the Boston Branch of the NAACP, spearheaded the effort for school desegregation in Boston.
 Jean McGuire, executive director of the Metropolitan Council for Educational Opportunity (METCO, Inc.) and the first female African American to gain a seat on the Boston School Committee at Large right after the Boston busing desegregation
 Kevin White (mayor), United States politician best known as the Mayor of Boston, during the late 1960s and the 1970s. White won the mayoral office in the 1967 general election in a hard-fought campaign opposing the anti-busing and anti-desegregation Boston School Committee member Louise Day Hicks.
 Louise Day Hicks, an American politician and lawyer from Boston, Massachusetts, best known for her staunch opposition to desegregation in Boston Public Schools, and especially to court-ordered busing in the 1960s and 1970s
 Joe Moakley, a Democratic congressman from the Ninth District of Massachusetts. He won the seat from incumbent Louise Day Hicks in a 1972 rematch.
 South Boston High School was the site of many of the most vocal and violent protests of busing and desegregation. As a result of these protests, the school's community became unsafe for students; a federal court placed the school into receivership in December 1975.
 The Combahee River Collective, a Black lesbian feminist organization based across the river in Cambridge, included members who worked on school desegregation in Boston.
 Citywide Educational Coalition played an important role in the desegregation of the Boston Public Schools and advocated for school reform by providing parents with the skills necessary to participate in shaping education policy.
 List of incidents of civil unrest in the United States

References

Further reading

Books

Dissertations and theses

External links
 Digitized primary sources related to busing for school desegregation in Boston from various libraries and archives are available via Digital Commonwealth.
 
Busing in Boston: A research guide. Moakley Archive & Institute, Suffolk University.
Short YouTube video on Boston's busing crisis
How The Boston Busing Decision Still Affects City Schools 40 Years Later
Stark & Subtle Divisions: A Collaborative History of Segregation in Boston
Mayor Kevin H. White records, 1929-1999 (Bulk, 1968-1983). Boston City Archives.
Louise Day Hicks papers, 1971-1975 (Bulk, 1974-1975). Boston City Archives
School Committee Secretary Desegregation Files 1963-1984 (bulk: 1974–1976). Boston City Archives
Morgan et al. v. Hennigan et al. and related cases files, 1967-1979. Boston City Archives
W. Arthur Garrity, Jr. chambers papers on the Boston Schools Desegregation Case, 1972-1997, University Archives and Special Collections, Joseph P. Healey Library, University of Massachusetts Boston
Center for Law and Education: Morgan v. Hennigan case records, 1964-1994, University Archives and Special Collections, Joseph P. Healey Library, University of Massachusetts Boston
40 Years Later, Boston Looks Back On Busing Crisis
Collisions of Church & State: Religious Perspectives on Boston's School Desegregation Crisis
An International and Domestic Response to Boston Busing directed at Mayor Kevin White
What About the Kids?: A Look into the Student Perspective on Boston Desegregation

School segregation in the United States
African-American history in Boston
Riots and civil disorder in Massachusetts
History of racism in Massachusetts